The 1983 Giro d'Italia was the 66th edition of the Giro d'Italia, one of cycling's Grand Tours. The Giro began in Brescia, with a team time trial on 13 May, after the annulment of the prologue individual time trial the day before. Stage 11 occurred on 23 May with a stage to Pietrasanta, followed by a rest day. The race finished in Udine on 5 June.

Prologue
12 May 1983 — Brescia, (ITT)

The stage was cancelled because of a demonstration by metallurgists.

Stage 1
13 May 1983 — Brescia to Mantua,  (TTT)

Stage 2
14 May 1983 — Mantua to Comacchio,

Stage 3
15 May 1983 — Comacchio to Fano,

Stage 4
16 May 1983 — Pesaro to Todi,

Stage 5
17 May 1983 — Terni to Vasto,

Stage 6
18 May 1983 — Vasto to Campitello Matese,

Stage 7
19 May 1983 — Campitello Matese to Salerno,

Stage 8
20 May 1983 — Salerno to Terracina,

Stage 9
21 May 1983 — Terracina to Montefiascone,

Stage 10
22 May 1983 — Montefiascone to Bibbiena,

Stage 11
23 May 1983 — Bibbiena to Pietrasanta,

Rest day 1
24 May 1983

References

1983 Giro d'Italia
Giro d'Italia stages